Anutin Charnvirakul (born 13 September 1966 in Bangkok) is a Thai politician. , he is a Deputy Prime Minister of Thailand and is also the Minister of Public Health. Notably, he is the prominent public figure in charge of managing the COVID-19 pandemic in Thailand.

Early life and family
Nicknamed Noo (literally: Rattus), Anutin is the son of Chavarat Charnvirakul, former Minister of the Interior in the government of Abhisit Vejjajiva. He was first married to Satannuch Charnvirakul and has two children. His second marriage is to Sasitorn Charnvirakul. Anutin completed secondary education at Assumption College and higher education in engineering from Hofstra University in 1989.

Anuthin is heir to a major construction company fortune. His family's company, Sino-Thai Engineering and Construction PCL, built several government mega-projects such as Bangkok’s Suvarnabhumi Airport. An engineer, Anuthin served as president of Sino-Thai.

He has over the years been a member of many political parties such as the National Development Party, Thai Rak Thai Party and as leader of the Bhumjaithai Party.

Political career
In 1996, he entered  politics by becoming adviser to Prachuap Chaiyasan (the Minister of Foreign Affairs) and served as Deputy Minister of Public Health from 2004 to 2005 and Deputy Minister of Commerce in 2004. He was then banned from political office for five years due to his membership of the Thai Rak Thai Party. Anutin then joined the Bhumjaithai Party in 2012 after the expiration of the ban and was elected as the leader of the Bhumjaithai Party on 14 October 2012.

In the 2019 Thai general election, he was the Bhumjaithai Party's candidate for prime minister.

Anutin has been a leading proponent of medical marijuana. On May 8, he said his ministry would give away 1 million cannabis plants in June 2022 to Thai households for license-free cultivation.

Controversy
During the COVID-19 pandemic, Anutin made a series of derogatory comments disparaging foreigners. Anutin wrote on a Twitter account, "...all you see are farangs ('Westerners'). They flee their own countries for the safety of Thailand. In Chiang Mai, 90% of Thais are wearing face masks, although none of the farangs are wearing masks." He went on to add, "This is the reason our country is being infected [by the SARS-CoV-2 virus]. We should be more careful of the farang than other Asians. At the moment it is winter in Europe and farang come to Thailand to hide from the [Covid-19] disease. Many farang dress dirtily and don't shower. All [Thai] hosts have to be very careful."

Following a negative public reaction to Anutin's outburst, the Twitter account was deleted, after attracting hundreds of comments across various media platforms, criticizing his ill-considered remarks, with some commentators pointing out that Thailand did not appreciate the contribution made to its economy by foreign tourism. Pressed on the matter, Anutin later claimed that he did not know who the Twitter account belonged to and that he did not post the comments, although he later apologised for them. The Thai language news website Khaosod covered the incident in detail, showing a portion of the original comments before the Twitter account was deleted.

A month prior to his March outburst, in February 2020, Anutin was criticised for remarking that foreigners should be kicked out of Thailand when he saw some who were not wearing face masks at an event at the Siam BTS station in Bangkok.  Later, hearing advice from the US Surgeon General, Dr Jerome Adams, that the wearing of masks was unnecessary for the uninfected, Anutin changed his opinion.

Royal decorations 
Anutin has received the following royal decorations in the Honours System of Thailand:
  Knight Grand Cordon (Special Class) of The Most Noble Order of the Crown of Thailand
  Knight Grand Cordon (Special Class) of the Most Exalted Order of the White Elephant

References

1966 births
Anutin Charnvirakul
Anutin Charnvirakul
Anutin Charnvirakul
Anutin Charnvirakul
Living people
Anutin Charnvirakul
Anutin Charnvirakul
Anutin Charnvirakul
Anutin Charnvirakul
Cantonese people
Anutin Charnvirakul
Anutin Charnvirakul